Spargapises was the son of queen Tomyris of the Massagetai.

Name 

Life

Background
 was the son of the king of the Massagetai and of his queen, Tomyris. After the death of the king, the widowed Tomyris succeeded him as the ruler of the tribe, and, once he had become old enough,  became the leader of the army of the Massagetai.

War against Persia
When the founder of the Persian Achaemenid Empire,  II, asked for the hand of Tomyris with the intent of acquiring her kingdom through the marriage, she understood 's aims and rejected his proposal. On the advice of the Lydian , Kūruš responded to Tomyris's rejection by deciding to invade the Massagetai.

Death
's initial assault against the Massagetai was routed by them, after which he set up a fancy banquet with large amounts of wine in the tents of his camp as an ambush and withdrew.

Aftermath

Notes

Sources

 
 
 
 
 
 
 

530 BC deaths
Year of birth unknown
6th-century BC Iranian people
Massagetae